The Willis Resilience Expedition was a scientific and exploratory program that took place in Antarctica from November 2013 to January 2014, with the goal of a better understanding of changes in the Earth's climate brought on by global warming in addition to weather-related risk. Announced in August 2013, the expedition was led by explorer Douglas Stoup and Parker Liautaud, a teenage polar adventurer and environmental campaigner. The expedition was underwritten by Willis Group, a global risk advisor, insurance and reinsurance broker.

The communications team, including driver and mechanic Eyjo Furteitsson, communication manager Nathan Hambrook-Skinner, and cinematographer Paddy Scott trailed the team in the 6x6 expedition truck built especially for the expedition by Arctic Trucks.

The expedition consisted of three main components:
 Science. Liautaud and Stoup conducted an isotope transect of Antarctica by collecting snow samples on which stable isotope analysis will be conducted in the hope of providing a valuable contribution to human understanding of Antarctic climate and potential for climate change.
 World Record Attempt. Parker Liautaud attempted to ski 640 km unsupported from the coast of Antarctica to the South Pole in 22 days, setting a “coast to Pole” speed record. At 19 years old, he also broke the record of the youngest person to ski to both the North and the South Poles.
 Live Communications. The Expedition was accompanied by a custom-built 6x6 communications truck outfitted with equipment that provided 24/7 connectivity to the rest of the world, enabling Paddy Scott, the expedition cameraman and photographer to document Liautaud and Stoup's journey in real time. Scott facilitated the Antarctic end of the live broadcasts from the Antarctic Plateau and the first live broadcast from the South Pole.

The Science: Antarctica as a Source of Environmental Information
While one of the harshest environments on the planet, Antarctica offers scientists important clues about environmental change. Its ice sheet contains a record of past climates, chronicling changes in temperatures and greenhouse gas concentrations in the atmosphere stretching back hundreds of thousands of years.

According to the British Antarctic Survey, the Antarctic Peninsula is also one of the fastest warming parts of the planet. Melting of Antarctica's ice sheets could cause sea levels to rise much more than already predicted.

Weather Station Deployment
Liautaud and Stoup deployed a lightweight weather station, the ColdFacts-3000BX, developed at the Delft University of Technology and was untested in Antarctica. The weather station was deployed near Union Glacier camp and tested over a period of five weeks, relaying meteorological data every 30 minutes.

Isotope Hydrology Sampling
The Expedition also undertook a “coast-to-Pole-to-coast” survey of Antarctic stable isotope trends, covering hundreds of kilometers of previously unstudied territory. These observations provided new information on the rate of change in Antarctic temperatures in recent years. Samples were sent to the International Atomic Energy Agency Isotope Hydrology laboratories for analysis.

Transcontinental Tritium Study
The team conducted a transcontinental study of the deposition rate of tritium, a radioactive isotope of hydrogen, across Antarctica. The relatively short half-life of tritium means it can be used to date snow and ice up to around 150 years old. The data can then be used to better understand the global water cycle, which is intrinsically linked to changes in climate. This was the first large-scale study of tritium in Antarctica since tritium returned to normal levels following the spike caused by thermonuclear tests in the 1960s. The samples were sent to GNS Science, a New Zealand Crown Research Institute, for analysis.

World Speed Record Attempt
After the scientific survey was complete, the Willis Resilience Expedition set off on December 3, 2013 from the Ross Ice Shelf where Liautaud and Stoup began their journey skiing 640 km to the South Pole, crossing the Transantarctic Mountains, which ascend to 4,500 meters at the summit.

They set an unsupported “coast to Pole” speed record. Breaking the record set in 2011 by Norway's Christian Eide, via a different route. Liautaud also became the youngest person to reach both the North and the South Poles.

Live Communications
The expedition truck that was used as transport during the sample-taking portion of the expedition was also used to transmit live video and data online during the speed race. The communication system employed two Iridium Pilot systems and a remote camera rig. The truck did not provide expedition support during the race to the Pole.

Another aspect of live coverage was interactive visualizations, provided by global IT provider EMC Corporation, of data gathered on the expedition.

References

External links
Parker Liautaud official website
Parker Liautaud YouTube

2013 in Antarctica
Antarctic expeditions
United States and the Antarctic
Expeditions from the United States
2014 in Antarctica
History of the Ross Dependency